Joëlle Mélin (born 26 March 1950) is a French politician who has represented the 9th constituency of the Bouches-du-Rhône department in the National Assembly since 2022. A member of the National Rally (RN), she previously served as a Member of the European Parliament (MEP) from 2014 to 2022.

Political career 
Mélin, who graduated in medical education from Aix-Marseille University, joined the National Rally (then National Front) in 1993. She held a seat in the Regional Council of Provence-Alpes-Côte d'Azur from 2010 to 2015. Since 2014, she has also been a municipal councillor in Aubagne.

Mélin was elected as a Member of the European Parliament for South-West France in 2014. Following her 2022 election to the National Assembly in the 9th constituency of Bouches-du-Rhône, she was succeeded by Éric Minardi as an MEP.

References

1950 births
Living people
MEPs for South-West France 2014–2019
National Rally (France) MEPs
People from Versailles
Aix-Marseille University alumni
MEPs for France 2019–2024
21st-century French women politicians
Deputies of the 16th National Assembly of the French Fifth Republic
Members of Parliament for Bouches-du-Rhône
Women members of the National Assembly (France)
National Rally (France) politicians
21st-century women MEPs for France
Members of the Regional Council of Provence-Alpes-Côte d'Azur
French city councillors